Love in Another Language is a 2009 Turkish drama film directed by İlksen Başarır, starring Mert Fırat as a young deaf man who falls in love with a call-center worker.

Production
The film was shot on location in Istanbul, Turkey.

Plot 
Onur, who has been deaf since birth, works as a librarian. His father had left him and his mother when he was seven, and Onur has always blamed himself for this. Although being able to speak, he has chosen to stay silent because of the pitying looks of the people around him. At his friend Vedat's engagement party, he meets Zeynep, who later finds out about Onur's hearing disability, but is not bothered by it. She is forced by her overbearing father to leave home and gets a job at a call-center. Having to speak on the phone all day to people she doesn't know, Zeynep finds peace with Onur, who she communicates with perfectly without speaking...

Cast 
 Mert Fırat - Onur
 Saadet Aksoy - Zeynep
 Lale Mansur - Kadife
 Emre Karayel - Aras

Release

General release 

Festival screenings 
 46th Antalya Golden Orange Film Festival
 4th Bursa International Silk Road Film Festival
 21st Ankara International Film Festival

Reception

Box office
The film twice reached number nine in the Turkish box office chart and has made a total gross of $771,785.

Awards
 46th Antalya Golden Orange Film Festival
 City Council Jury's Special Award: İlksen Başarır (Won)
 4th Bursa International Silk Road Film Festival
 Best Actress Award: Saadet Aksoy (Won)
 Turkish Film Critics Association (SİYAD) jury prize
 21st Ankara International Film Festival (11–21 March 2010)
 Best Leading Actor Award: Mert Fırat (Won)
 Best Leading Actress Award: Saadet Aksoy (Won)
 3rd Yeşilçam Awards (March 23, 2010)
 Best Actor: Mert Fırat (Won)

See also 
 2009 in film
 Turkish films of 2009

References

External links
  for the film
 Başarır highlights social  issue via modern-day romance discussion with the director
 

2009 films
2009 drama films
Films set in Turkey
Turkish drama films
2000s Turkish-language films